Nicolau dos Reis Lobato (24 May 1946 – 31 December 1978) was an East Timorese politician who is considered the national hero of the country.

Biography
Lobato was born in Soibada, Portuguese Timor on 24 May 1946. 

Lobato was the first prime minister of the Democratic Republic of East Timor from 28 November to 7 December 1975. Upon the invasion by the Indonesian military, Lobato, along with other key Fretilin leaders, fled into the Timorese hinterland to fight against the occupying forces. On the final day of 1978, Lobato was ambushed by Indonesian special forces led by Lieutenant Prabowo Subianto (later son-in-law of President Suharto) at Mount Mindelo.

He was killed after being shot in the stomach on 31 December 1978 and his body was brought to Dili to be inspected by Indonesian press. What then happened to his body is unknown, but the East Timorese government continues to pursue the issue with the Indonesian government, so that his remains can be given a proper burial.

East Timor's main airport was renamed Presidente Nicolau Lobato International Airport in his honour.

Gallery

Notes

References

Further reading

External links
 Biography of Nicolau Lobato in Portuguese, English translation

1946 births
1978 deaths
People from Liquiçá District
Mambai people
Fretilin politicians
Prime Ministers of East Timor
Presidents of East Timor
Deaths by firearm in East Timor
Military personnel killed in action
Lobato
East Timorese Christian socialists